Bertha van Hasselt (22 September 1878 – 11 June 1932) was a Dutch painter. Her work was part of the painting event in the art competition at the 1928 Summer Olympics.

References

1878 births
1932 deaths
20th-century Dutch painters
Dutch women painters
Olympic competitors in art competitions
People from Zwolle
20th-century Dutch women artists